Hal March (born Harold Mendelson; April 22, 1920 – January 19, 1970) was an American comedian, actor, and television quiz show emcee.

Early career
March entered show business as a straight man in the vaudeville act the Hollywood Rioteers, before serving in the U.S. Army beginning in 1941. He began his career in broadcasting as an announcer at Station KYA in San Francisco. From 1944 through 1948 he teamed with comedy partner Bob Sweeney in The Bob Sweeney-Hal March Show on CBS Radio. He also appeared in The Adventures of Sam Spade, which ran on CBS 1946-1949.

March co-starred as Harry Morton on The George Burns and Gracie Allen Show on the NBC and CBS radio networks from the mid-1940s until 1950.  When the show switched to television that year, he continued in the role until the middle of the season, in 1951.  During the next few seasons, he appeared occasionally in various guest roles on the show.

March and Mary Jane Croft co-starred in Too Many Cooks, a summer replacement program on CBS radio in 1950. The comedy centered on Douglas and Carrie Cook and their 10 children.

He went on to appear on such shows as The Imogene Coca Show, I Love Lucy, and Willy. In the summer of 1955, March joined John Dehner and Tom D'Andrea in the 11-episode NBC summer series, The Soldiers, a military comedy produced and directed by Bud Yorkin. D'Andrea temporarily left the William Bendix sitcom The Life of Riley for this chance at his own series.

He was the Mystery Guest on the October 9, 1955 episode of What's My Line? He was guessed by Bennett Cerf.

The $64,000 Question
March was arguably best known as the host of The $64,000 Question, which he helmed from 1955 to 1958. In addition to his hosting duties, March also sang a version of the show's theme music in 1956, titled "Love Is the Sixty-Four Thousand Dollar Question."

As a result of the quiz show scandals, the show was canceled, and with the exception of a few film roles such as Hear Me Good and Send Me No Flowers, March was largely out of work for nearly a decade.

Later career
To keep busy, March continued to appear in guest-starring roles, even starring in a 1961 unsold television pilot for a comedy titled I Married a Dog, in which his life was constantly upset by his wife's pooch. He appeared in several sitcoms in 1966 that are still widely rerun today. Among these are a role as the father of Gidget's boyfriend Jeff in the Gidget episode "In and Out with the In-Laws" and the head of corrupt dance studio in The Monkees episode "Dance Monkee, Dance." He also made appearances in the sitcoms Hey, Landlord and The Lucy Show as well as in the film A Guide for the Married Man.

In 1961, he played the lead in Neil Simon's first Broadway play "Come Blow Your Horn," a hit that ran 677 performances.

Death
March's career took a turn for the better in July 1969 when he began hosting the game show It's Your Bet. After completing approximately 13 weeks of taping, however, he complained of exhaustion. Tests revealed that he had lung cancer, the result of years of chain smoking. He had one lung removed. When he subsequently contracted pneumonia, he was too weak to fight it. March died in January 1970 in Los Angeles at age 49, and is buried in Hillside Memorial Park Cemetery.

Accolades
March was awarded two stars on the Hollywood Walk of Fame, one for his radio work at 1560 Vine Street, and another for his work in television at 6536 Hollywood Boulevard.

Personal life 

In 1956, March married Candy Toxton, the former wife of singer Mel Tormé. March was stepfather to Toxton's two children from her previous marriage, Steve March-Tormé and Melissa Tormé. He and Toxton had three children together: Peter, Jeffrey, and Victoria.

His grandson Hunter March hosted the game show Emogenius. He also hosts the Netflix series Sugar Rush  and E! TV's Nightly Pop.

Filmography

References

External links
 
 
 

1920 births
1970 deaths
American game show hosts
American male television actors
American male comedians
American male radio actors
Jewish American comedians
Deaths from lung cancer in California
20th-century American male actors
Jewish American male actors
Burials at Hillside Memorial Park Cemetery
20th-century American comedians
Jewish American male comedians
20th-century American Jews